Juicy Fruit (Disco Freak) is the tenth studio album by American soul musician Isaac Hayes. The album was released in 1976. The album debuted at number 124 on the Billboard 200.

Track listing
All tracks composed by Isaac Hayes

References

1976 albums
Isaac Hayes albums
albums produced by Isaac Hayes